The UConn–UMass rivalry is a sports rivalry between the UConn Huskies of the University of Connecticut and the UMass Minutemen of the University of Massachusetts.

Football

The UConn–UMass football rivalry  is an American college football rivalry between the UConn Huskies football team of the University of Connecticut and the UMass Minutemen football team of the University of Massachusetts Amherst.

The rivalry was dormant from the 2000 season, when UConn moved to FBS, until 2012, when UMass traveled to Rentschler Field to play the Huskies in the season opener.

History
The first game played between the two schools took place on November 6, 1897, in Amherst, Massachusetts. Massachusetts won 36–0. At the time, UMass was known as Massachusetts Agricultural College and Connecticut was officially Storrs Agricultural College. They had formed a loose association with other public colleges in New England such as present day New Hampshire and Rhode Island for the purpose of scheduling football matchups between the schools.

The colleges continued to schedule matches intermittently until after World War I, when they began to play on an almost-yearly basis through the mid-1920s. The series was discontinued until 1932, when the schools again met each year until World War II saw both universities disband their football teams. The schools would not match up again on the gridiron until UConn joined Massachusetts in the Yankee Conference in 1952. UConn and UMass played every season from that point on until UConn began their transition to what was then Division I-A in 2000.

UMass leads the all-time series 38-36–2. Massachusetts dominated the rivalry early, winning the first eight and 13 of the first 15 meetings between the two universities. Connecticut went on a streak of their own after that, winning 14 of the next 16 games. The 1960s again belonged to the then-Redmen of Massachusetts, as they lost only two games that decade. In the remaining years of the rivalry, the series was much more even, with neither team able to put together a winning streak of more than four games.

In April 2011, UMass announced plans to join the Mid-American Conference and move up to the NCAA Football Bowl Subdivision, the highest level of college football in the country. Prior to this decision, the two schools had scheduled a game for August 30, 2012.  UMass later became a FBS Independent school starting in 2016.

The Huskies won the latest matchup against the Minutemen during the 2022 season at Rentschler Field in East Hartford, Connecticut.

On October 31, 2022, UConn and UMass extended the rivalry games through 2027, including a neutral site game in 2023.

Game results

Men's basketball

Results

Men's ice hockey

Results

See also  
 List of NCAA college football rivalry games

References

College football rivalries in the United States
UConn Huskies football
UMass Minutemen football